George McIntyre Wilson (23 May 1905 – 22 May 1984) was a Scottish professional footballer who played as a midfielder for Clydebank, Alloa Athletic, Huddersfield Town, Leeds United and Chesterfield.

References

External links
Leeds United profile

1905 births
1984 deaths
Footballers from Kilmarnock
Scottish footballers
Association football midfielders
English Football League players
Clydebank F.C. (1914) players
Alloa Athletic F.C. players
Huddersfield Town A.F.C. players
Leeds United F.C. players
Chesterfield F.C. players
Date of death missing
Scottish Football League players